EOS is the built-in operating system of the Coleco Adam.

Overview 

The functions are grouped into categories as follows.

Executive calls 
 eos_init
 eos_hard_init
 eos_hard_reset_net
 eos_delay_after_hard_reset
 eos_synchronize_clocks
 eos_scan_for_devices
 eos_relocate_pcb
 eos_soft_init
 eos_exit_to_smartwriter
 eos_switch_memory_banks

Console Output 
 eos_console_init
 eos_console_display_regular
 eos_console_display_special

Printer Interface 
 eos_print_character
 eos_print_buffer
 eos_printer_status
 eos_start_print_character
 eos_end_print_character

Keyboard Interface 
 eos_keyboard_status
 eos_read_keyboard
 eos_start_read_keyboard
 eos_end_read_keyboard

File Operations 
 eos_file_manager_init
 eos_check_directory_for_file
 eos_find_file_1
 eos_find_file_2
 eos_find_file_in_fcb
 eos_check_file_mode
 eos_make_file
 eos_update_file_in_directory
 eos_open_file
 eos_close_file
 eos_read_file
 eos_write_file
 eos_trim_file
 eos_initialize_directory
 eos_reset_file
 eos_get_date
 eos_put_date
 eos_delete_file
 eos_rename_file

Device Operations 
 eos_find_pcb
 eos_find_dcb
 eos_request_device_status
 eos_get_device_status
 eos_soft_reset_device
 eos_soft_reset_keyboard
 eos_soft_reset_printer
 eos_read_block
 eos_read_one_block
 eos_start_read_one_block
 eos_end_read_one_block
 eos_write_block
 eos_write_one_block
 eos_start_write_one_block
 eos_end_write_one_block
 eos_start_read_character_device
 eos_end_read_character_device
 eos_read_character_device
 eos_start_write_character_device
 eos_end_write_character_device
 eos_write_character_device

Video RAM Management 
 eos_set_vdp_ports
 eos_set_vram_table_address
 eos_load_ascii_in_vdp
 eos_put_ascii_in_vdp
 eos_write_vram
 eos_read_vram
 eos_put_vram
 eos_get_vram
 eos_write_vdp_register
 eos_read_vdp_register
 eos_fill_vram
 eos_calculate_pattern_position
 eos_point_to_pattern_position
 eos_write_sprite_table

Game Controllers 
 eos_read_game_controller
 eos_update_spinner

Sound Routines 
 eos_sound_init
 eos_sound_off
 eos_start_sound
 eos_play_sound
 eos_end_sound

Subroutines 
 eos_decrement_low_nibble
 eos_decrement_high_nibble
 eos_move_high_nibble_to_low_nibble
 eos_add_a_to_hl

References

External links 
 Technical Reference Manual chapter 3
 EOS-5 source code
 Boot code, Forum

Disk operating systems
Discontinued operating systems
1983 software